The Ataa Movement, is an Iraqi political party recently established by the head of the Popular Mobilization Forces
and Iraqi National Security Adviser Falih Alfayyadh.

History
The founding members of the party met in 2017, and the first nucleus of a "Ataa movement" was founded on a body composed of 8 members. Falih Alfayyadh played a key role in the movement's leadership committee, which was formed to create an ideological equilibrium with communism, secularism, Arab nationalism and other ideas.

References

External links
 Speech of Falih Alfayyadh during the establishment of a Ataa movement - YouTube

2017 establishments in Iraq
Formerly banned political parties
Iran–Iraq relations
Islamic political parties in Iraq
Political parties established in 2017
Political parties in Iraq
Shia Islam in Iraq
Shia Islamic political parties